The 1968–69 Libyan Premier League was the 5th edition of the competition since its inception in 1963.

Classification

Libyan Premier League seasons
Libya
Premier League